Long-tailed rat can refer to several rodents:
Leopoldamys edwardsi, from Southeast Asia;
Melomys levipes, from Australasia;
Pseudomys higginsi, from Australia;
Rattus rattus, the black rat, cosmopolitan;
Sigmodontomys aphrastus, from Costa Rica, Panama, and Ecuador.

Animal common name disambiguation pages